The 2022 Rally Finland (also known as the Secto Rally Finland 2022) was a motor racing event for rally cars that was held over four days between 4 and 7 August 2022. It marked the seventy-first running of the Rally Finland. The event was the eighth round of the 2022 World Rally Championship, World Rally Championship-2 and World Rally Championship-3.

Elfyn Evans and Scott Martin were the defending rally winners. Their team, Toyota Gazoo Racing WRT, were the defending manufacturers' winners. Teemu Suninen and Mikko Markkula were the defending rally winners in the WRC-2 category. Emil Lindholm and Reeta Hämäläinen were the defending rally winners in the WRC-3 category.

Ott Tänak and Martin Järveoja were the overall winners, securing their second win of the season. Their team, Hyundai Shell Mobis WRT, claimed their first ever Rally Finland victory. Emil Lindholm and Reeta Hämäläinen won the World Rally Championship-2 category after Teemu Suninen and Mikko Markkula were disqualified due to the front bumper of their Hyundai was found underweight. Lauri Joona and Tuukka Shemeikka won the World Rally Championship-3 category.

Background

Entry list
The following crews entered into the rally. The event was opened to crews competing in the World Rally Championship, its support categories, the World Rally Championship-2 and World Rally Championship-3, and privateer entries that were not registered to score points in any championship. Twelve entered under Rally1 regulations, as were seventeen Rally2 crews in the World Rally Championship-2 and five Rally3 crews in the World Rally Championship-3.

Itinerary
All dates and times are EEST (UTC+3).

Report

WRC Rally1

Classification

Special stages

Championship standings

WRC-2 Rally2

Classification

Special stages

Championship standings

WRC-3 Rally3

Classification

Special stages

Championship standings

Notes

References

External links

  
 2022 Rally Finland at eWRC-results.com
 2022 Rally Finland at rally-maps.com 

2022 in Finnish sport
Finland
August 2022 sports events in Finland
2022